Assassin(s) is a 1997 French drama film directed, co-written, and co-edited by Mathieu Kassovitz, who also stars as Max. It was entered into the 1997 Cannes Film Festival.

Cast
 Michel Serrault as Mr. Wagner
 Mathieu Kassovitz as Max
 Hélène de Fougerolles as Hélène
 Danièle Lebrun as Max's Mother
 Léa Drucker as Léa
 Mehdi Benoufa as Mehdi
 Robert Gendreu as Mr. Vidal
 François Levantal as Inspector

References

External links

1997 films
1997 crime drama films
1990s French-language films
French crime drama films
Films about contract killing
Films directed by Mathieu Kassovitz
Films scored by Carter Burwell
Features based on short films
1990s French films